Barbara Friedrich Parcinski (born 1949) is an American former track and field athlete who competed in the javelin throw. She was a member of the United States team at the 1968 Summer Olympics in Mexico City and was a gold medalist in the javelin at the 1967 Pan American Games in Winnipeg. Due to safety-related changes made to reduce the distance of javelin throws in high school competition, her record is unlikely to ever be exceeded.

Athletic competition
Friedrich attended Manasquan High School in Manasquan, New Jersey at a time before Title IX provided for greater opportunities for women to participate in interscholastic sports, and was required to compete together with the boys' track and field team.

Friedrich described that she was upset with her coach for ignoring her and used that anger to make a throw much harder than usual that traveled at a low trajectory and was aided by the wind. Meet officials verified that the javelin she used met all specifications and remeasured the field before certifying the distance. She set the United States overall record and the national high school record with the throw. Safety changes were made in 1999 to limit the distance of javelin throws.

A graduate in the class of 1967, Friedrich was inducted into the Manasquan High School Hall of Fame in 2008.

Friedrich represented the United States at the 1967 Pan American Games, where she won the gold medal. As a member of the U.S. team at the 1968 Summer Olympics in Mexico City, she finished in ninth place in the javelin after suffering an injury to her hamstring.

As a student at Newark State College (now Kean University) Friedrich won the national javelin title in 1970, while also competing in tennis, field hockey and basketball. She graduated in 1972 with a Bachelor of Arts degree in health and physical education in 1972. She was inducted into the Kean University Athletic Hall of Fame in 1981.

Personal life
Friedrich later married Clifford Parcinski. She is a resident of Spring Lake Heights, New Jersey. Friedrich was formerly a teacher in Toms River and has been a track coach.

References

1949 births
Living people
Manasquan High School alumni
People from Manasquan, New Jersey
People from Spring Lake Heights, New Jersey
Sportspeople from Monmouth County, New Jersey
Track and field athletes from New Jersey
American female javelin throwers
Olympic track and field athletes of the United States
Athletes (track and field) at the 1968 Summer Olympics
Pan American Games medalists in athletics (track and field)
Pan American Games gold medalists for the United States
Athletes (track and field) at the 1967 Pan American Games
Kean University alumni
Medalists at the 1967 Pan American Games
21st-century American women